The International Nuclear Society Council (INSC), founded on 11 November 1990 by the INSG (International group of Nuclear Societies), is a non-governmental organisation made up of Nuclear Societies from all over the world that "acts as a global forum for nuclear societies to discuss and establish common aims and goals".

Member societies
American Nuclear Society (ANS)
Asociacion Argentina de Tecnologia Nuclear (AATN)
Associação Brasileira de Energia Nuclear (ABEN)
Atomic Energy Society of Japan (AESJ)
Australian Nuclear Association (ANA)
Canadian Nuclear Society (CNS)
Egyptian Society of Nuclear Science and Applications (ESNSA)
European Nuclear Society (ENS)
Austrian Nuclear Society
Belgian Nuclear Society
Bulgarian Nuclear Society
Croatian Nuclear Society
Czech Nuclear Society
Finnish Nuclear Society
French Nuclear Energy Society
German Nuclear Society
Hungarian Nuclear Society
Israel Nuclear Society
Italian Nuclear Association
Lithuanian Nuclear Energy Association
Netherlands Nuclear Society
The Nuclear Institute
Nuclear Society of Russia
Nuclear Society of Serbia
Nuclear Society of Slovenia
Polish Nuclear Society
Romanian Nuclear Energy Association
Slovak Nuclear Society
Spanish Nuclear Society
Swedish Nuclear Society
Swiss Nuclear Society
Indian Nuclear Society (InNS)
Israel Nuclear Society (IsNS)
Korean Nuclear Society (KNS)
Latin American Section (LAS)
Nuclear Energy Society Taipei (NEST)
Pakistan Nuclear Society (PNS)
Sociedad Nuclear Mexicana (SNM)
Nuclear Society of Thailand (NST)

References

External links
http://insc.ans.org/ Homepage
INSC at the UIA

Nuclear organizations
Organizations established in 1990